Quail Ridge Reserve is a  nature reserve in northern California. It is located in the vicinity of Lake Berryessa and the Blue Ridge Berryessa Natural Area, in Napa County, California.

The Quail Ridge Reserve is administered by the University of California, Davis, and is a unit of the University of California Natural Reserve System.

The habitat protected is of the California interior chaparral and woodlands plant community. Quail Ridge Reserve is also the location of QuRiNet, a wireless mesh network.

See also
McLaughlin Natural Reserve
California chaparral and woodlands

References

External links
official Quail Ridge Reserve website
University of California, Davis: Natural Reserve System sites

Protected areas of Napa County, California
University of California, Davis
University of California Natural Reserve System